Joel O. Filani (born December 8, 1983) is a former American football wide receiver, and is the current wide receivers coach for the Washington State Cougars Football Team. He was drafted by the Tennessee Titans in the sixth round of the 2007 NFL Draft. He played college football at Texas Tech.

Filani was also a member of the Minnesota Vikings, Seattle Seahawks, Detroit Lions, St. Louis Rams, Tampa Bay Buccaneers, California Redwoods, San Jose SaberCats and Chicago Rush.

Early years
Filani attended Paradise Valley High School in Phoenix, Arizona and was a student and a letterman in football. In football, he was named to the First-team All-Arizona as a senior when he caught 40 passes for 653 yards and eight touchdowns and also rushed for 559 yards and five touchdowns on 62 attempts and ran up 623 yards and four touchdowns on 16 kickoff returns.  In addition to Texas Tech, Filani was recruited by Washington State and Colorado State.

College career
At Texas Tech, in 2006, Filani was again First-team All-Big 12 after catching 91 passes for 1,300 yards for a 14.3-yards per catch and 13 touchdowns. As a junior, he was First-team All-Big 12 in 2005 when he caught 65 passes for 1,007 yards a 15.5-yard average and 8 touchdowns. In 2004, he caught 12 passes for 310 yards and two touchdowns and led team with 17.2 yards per reception  In 2003, he played in all 13 games and finished the season with one reception for nine yards. He reshirted in 2002.

Professional career

Pre-draft

Tennessee Titans
He was drafted by the Tennessee Titans in the sixth round of the 2007 NFL Draft.

Tampa Bay Buccaneers
Filani was signed by the Tampa Bay Buccaneers on May 13, 2009. He was waived and subsequently placed on injured reserve on August 19. Filani was released with an injury settlement the following day.

Coaching career

Boise State
In 2013, Filani began his coaching career at Boise State working as a graduate assistant for the Broncos.

WSU
In 2015, Filani was hired by his former coach Mike Leach to become an offensive quality assistant at Washington State University.

North Texas
From 2016 to 2018, Filani served as the wide receivers coach for the North Texas Mean Green.

Texas Tech
In 2019, he joined the coaching staff of his alma mater where he worked as the wide receivers coach. He was not retained after the 2021 season.

WSU

On Jan. 3, 2022 he was named Wide Receivers coach, joining the staff of first year Head Coach Jake Dickert. Filani returns to the Palouse, one month after former Red Raiders teammate Eric Morris was named as the Cougs new Offensive Coordinator.

References

External links
Just Sports Stats
Tampa Bay Buccaneers bio
Texas Tech Red Raiders bio

1983 births
Living people
Sportspeople from Tempe, Arizona
Players of American football from Arizona
American football wide receivers
Texas Tech Red Raiders football players
Tennessee Titans players
Minnesota Vikings players
Seattle Seahawks players
Detroit Lions players
St. Louis Rams players
Tampa Bay Buccaneers players
Sacramento Mountain Lions players
San Jose SaberCats players
Chicago Rush players
Washington State Cougars football coaches
Boise State Broncos football coaches
North Texas Mean Green football coaches